Oestreicher or Österreicher may refer to:
A synonym to Silvaner (grape)
Österreicher (surname)
 A person from Österreich (Austria)